Adrian Durrer (born 13 July 2001) is a Swiss footballer who plays as a defender for Bellinzona on loan from Lugano.

Club career
On 24 June 2020, Durrer signed a professional contract with FC Basel. He made his professional debut with Basel in a 4–1 Swiss Super League win over FC Luzern on 13 March 2021, and scored his side's fourth goal in his debut in the 95th minute.

On 6 January 2022, he signed with Ticinesi Super League club Lugano. Durrer signed a contract with Lugano until 30 June 2026. He gave his debut as part of the starting lineup on 29 January 2022 in a 0–1 defeat against reigning Swiss champions BSC Young Boys.

On 27 January 2023, Durrer moved on loan to Bellinzona for the rest of the season.

Honours
Lugano
Swiss Cup: 2021–22

References

External links
 
 FC Basel Profile
 

2001 births
Footballers from Basel
Living people
Swiss men's footballers
Switzerland youth international footballers
Association football defenders
FC Basel players
FC Lugano players
AC Bellinzona players
Swiss Super League players
Swiss Promotion League players
Swiss 1. Liga (football) players